Proteagailovca is a village in the municipality of Bender (Tighina), Moldova. It had a population of 3,142 at the 2004 Census. The locality, although situated on the right (western) bank of the river Dniester, is under the control of the breakaway Transnistrian authorities. Proteagailovca is located immediately to the west of the city, and is the only other locality in the municipality, except the city of Bender itself. 

Of the 3,142 inhabitants of Proteagailovca, 1,482 (47.17%) Russians, 658 (20.94%) Ukrainians, 756 (24.06%) are Moldovans, 163 (5.19%) Bulgarians, 25 (0.80%) Gagauzians, 19 (0.60%) Belarusians, 6 (0.19%) Germans, 2 (0.06%) Jews, and 31 (0.48%) others and non-declared.

References

Villages of Bender Municipality 
Populated places under Transnistrian control
Bessarabia Governorate